Scots-Quebecers are Quebecers who are of Scottish descent.

Background

Few Scots came to Quebec (then New France) before the Seven Years' War.  Those who did blended in with the French population.  Perhaps the first Scot to settle was Abraham Martin dit l'Écossais (1589-1664), who by the year 1800 had 7,765 married descendants among the French-speaking population.

In 1763, the French population of Quebec was approximately 55,000 when France handed it over to Great Britain under the terms of the Treaty of Paris (1763) that ended the French and Indian War.

By the beginning of the 19th century, the Quebec population was expanding slowly as immigration began from Great Britain. Impoverished Scottish immigrants, many the victim of the Highland and Lowland Clearances, saw unlimited opportunity in this huge forested land.  The bond between Scotland and France, however, also extended to numerous other areas such as the Gens d’Armes Ecossais (Scots Men-At-Arms) who guarded the kings of France for nearly three hundred years. Today in France there are many descendants of these Scots who have lived there for centuries. They carry names such as Campbell and MacDonald, the most famous of the latter being Jacques MacDonald, Marshal of France.

Settling
Some of these Scottish immigrants settled in Quebec City but many with an entrepreneurial drive kept moving west to Montreal which at the time was little more than a small port town on the St. Lawrence River. By far the majority of the Scots arrived in Quebec with little more than the shirt on their back. John Redpath, who had only enough money for ships passage to Quebec City, walked all the way to Montreal.

Commerce, science and culture

In 1779, Scotsman Simon McTavish helped establish what would become the North West Company to compete in the fur trade with the English owned giant, the Hudson's Bay Company. Since 1670, the Hudson's Bay Company had been operating an unchallenged monopoly in the territory in the northwest known as Rupert's Land, which comprised nearly half of what is now Canada. In the process, McTavish became the most important businessman in all of Canada during the second half of the 18th century.

By the first decade of the 1800s, Montreal had grown to around 9,000 inhabitants and the Scottish immigrants who chose to make Montreal their home soon began to play a key role in the city's cultural, scientific, and business life. Although at their peak, the Scots made up only a small percentage of Quebec's population, they affected the city of Montreal and the Province of Quebec far beyond their numbers. Starting from an almost non-existent economic base, they were instrumental in improving the Province's commercial prospects by exploiting an untapped hinterland. They transformed the small fortified town into the business hub for much of the St Lawrence basin and worked to enhance the Province's economic power. Scots led a wave of immigrants seeking a better life that saw Montreal's population grow from 9,000 in 1800 to 50,000 by the year 1850.

Other Scots were instrumental in building the Lachine Canal that turned Montreal into one of the most important and prosperous ports in North America. The canal led to a rapid industrialization that began in the late 1840s with Montreal manufacturers producing products for the entire nation. It was also Scots who constructed Montreal's first bridge across the Saint Lawrence River and Henry Morgan built the first department store in Canada that was the envy of the country. Scot settlers founded many of the city's great industries including the Bank of Montreal, Redpath Sugar, and from headquarters they established in Montreal, Scots were the driving force that built both of Canada's national railroads. Early on, they realized the importance for the mercantile community to create the institutions and instruments that enabled business to be the catalyst for improved standards of living for all its citizens. Because of their work and vision, by 1860 they were greatly responsible for making Montreal the most important city in British North America.

Noted for their willingness to help fellow Scots succeed in the new world, they are also remembered for giving back to the country that had provided them with the opportunity to prosper. Scots established and funded numerous Montreal institutions such as McGill University, the Literary and Historical Society of Quebec and the Royal Victoria Hospital.

Notable Scots-Quebecers
A few of these Scots and their offspring who were major factors in building Montreal and the Province of Quebec into the economic hub of Canada are:

Hugh Allan (1810–1882), financier and shipping magnate
Montagu H. Allan (1860–1951), banker, ship owner, sportsman
Richard Bladworth Angus (1831–1922), banker
Robert Mitchell Ballantyne (1859–1929), businessman
Aeneas Cameron (1757–1822), fur trader
Thomas Neill Cream (1850–1892), serial killer
John William Dawson (1820–1899), scientist, educator
Richard Dobie (1731–1805), fur trader, businessman
William Dow (1800–1868), brewer and businessman
George Alexander Drummond (1829–1910), entrepreneur
James Dunlop (1757–1815), businessman
Robert Ellice (1747–1790), merchant and fur trader
 Malcolm Fraser (1733-1815), army and militia officer, seigneur, and office holder
Duncan Fisher (1753–1820), businessman
Hugh Graham (1848–1938), newspaper publisher
Peter Grant (1764–1848), fur trader
William Grant (1744–1805), merchant, politician
Alexander Henderson (1831–1913), merchant and photographer
 James D. Johnson (1949) businessman
William C. Macdonald (1831–1917), tobacco manufacturer, philanthropist
Dugald Lorn MacDougall (1811–1885), stockbroker, investor
Hugh Mackay (1832–1890), businessman
Robert Mackay (1840–1916), businessman, statesman
Roderick Mackenzie (1761–1844), fur trader, politician
James McGill (1744–1813), fur trader, merchant, politician
Peter McGill (1789–1860), businessman, politician
William McGillivray (1764–1825), fur trader
Duncan McIntyre (1834–1894), businessman
Simon McTavish (1750–1804), fur trader, saw mill and flour mill operator
Henry Morgan (1819–1893), built the first department store in Canada
John Nairne soldier and seigneur 
John Neilson (1776–1848), printer, publisher, politician
Alexander Walker Ogilvie (1829–1902), miller, statesman
William Watson Ogilvie (1835–1900), businessman
Andrew Paton (1833–1892), textile manufacturer, politician
John Redpath (1796–1869), contractor, industrialist
Peter Redpath (1821–1894), businessman
James Gibb Ross (1819–1888), merchant, statesman
James Ross (1848–1913), railway engineer, businessman
William Henry Scott (1799–1851), politician, businessman
Philip Simpson Ross (1827–1907), founder of the Order of Chartered Accountants of Quebec
George Simpson (1787–1860), executive, fur trader
Donald Alexander Smith (1820–1914), fur trader, financier, railroad baron and politician.
George Stephen (1829–1921), banker and railway executive
Daniel Sutherland (1756–1832), businessman
David Torrance (1805–1876), merchant, banker
John Torrance (1786–1870), merchant, shipper
William Watson (c.1795–1867), miller, businessman, politician
John Young (1811–1878), entrepreneur, statesman
John Young (c.1759–1819), seigneur, businessman, judge and politician

See also

Scottish-Canadian
Scottish American
Celtic music in Canada
Québécois
Anglo-Quebecer
Irish Quebecers
List of Irish Quebecers

References

Further reading

 McCulloch, Ian Macpherson and Steve Noon (2008). Highlander in the French-Indian War. 1756-67, Osprey Publishing, 64 p.  (online excerpt)
 Ouellet, Jeannine (2007). Des Écossais à Rivière-du-Loup et leurs descendants (1763–2004), Montréal: Éditions Histoire Québec, 476 p. 
 McCulloch, Ian Macpherson (2006). Sons of the Mountains: A History of the Highland Regiments in North America During the French & Indian War, 1756-1767, Purple Mountain Press & Fort Ticonderoga, vol. 1: 392 p., vol 2: 208 p.
 Campey, Lucille H. (2006). Les Écossais: The Pioneer Scots of Lower Canada, 1763-1855, Toronto: Natural Heritage Books, 332 pages  (online excerpt)
 Marrelli, Nancy and Simon Dardick (2005). The Scots of Montreal: A Pictorial Album, Montreal: Véhicule Press, 156 p. 
 Bennett, Margaret (2004). Oatmeal and the Catechism. Scottish Gaelic Settlers in Quebec, Montreal: McGill-Queen's Press, 352 pages  (online excerpt)
 Beaulieu, Carl (2001). L'alliance écossaise au Québec, Chicoutimi: Éditions du Patrimoine, 486 p. 
 MacLeod, Alistair (1999). No Great Mischief, Toronto : M&S, 283 p.
 Symons, Jeffrey (1992). The Auld Alliance in Canada: A Brief Examination of the Relationship between the French and the Scots throughout Canada's History, Lovell Litho 
 Little, John Irvine (1991). Crofters and Habitants. Settler Society, Economy, and Culture in a Quebec Township, 1848-1881, Montreal: McGill-Queen's University Press, 392 pages (online excerpt)
 Price, Lynda. (1981). Introduction to the Social History of Scots in Quebec (1780–1840), Ottawa: National Museums of Canada, 152 pages 
 Baldwin, Alice Sharples (1960). Metis, wee Scotland of the Gaspé, Montreal: An-lo Inc., 63 p.
 Le Moine, James MacPherson (1881). "The Scot in New France, 1535-1880", in Transactions of the Literary and Historical Association of Quebec. Sessions of 1880-81, Quebec: Morning Chronicle Office, 1881 (online)

Culture of Quebec
Quebec
+Scots
+Q
Scots
European-Canadian culture in Quebec